Xaliproden (codenamed SR57746) is a drug which acts as a 5HT1A agonist. It has neurotrophic and neuroprotective effects in vitro, and has been proposed for use in the treatment of several neurodegenerative conditions including amyotrophic lateral sclerosis (ALS) and Alzheimer's disease.

Development of xaliproden for these two indications was discontinued in 2007 following analysis of Phase III data. While the drug did show an effect on hippocampal volume (suggesting perhaps a slowing of cell loss), there was insufficient evidence for efficacy in counteracting Alzheimer's related cognitive decline. Similarly while there were some indicators of efficacy in ALS, including a small but clinically noteworthy effect on some functional parameters, the overall benefit did not reach statistical significance when results across several Phase III trials were averaged. Xaliproden remains under investigation for treatment of chemotherapy-induced peripheral neuropathy.

Paliroden was also explored as a treatment for people living with dementia.

References

Abandoned drugs
Serotonin receptor agonists
Trifluoromethyl compounds
Tetrahydropyridines
2-Naphthyl compounds